William C. Harris is Professor Emeritus of History at North Carolina State University. In 2012, he was co-winner of the 2012 Lincoln Prize (shared with Elizabeth D. Leonard).

Education 
He began graduate school in 1958 at the University of Alabama.

Career 
Harris served in the U.S. Air Force before graduate school.

He is also on the Advisory Council of Ford's Theatre and serves on the Board of Advisors for Knox College's Lincoln Studies Center.

Awards 
Harris's With charity for all: Lincoln and the restoration of the Union came in second place for the Lincoln Prize in 1998. He then received the Lincoln Diploma of Honor from the Lincoln Memorial University in 2003.

In 2008, Harris's writing was also awarded Henry Adams Prize offered by the Society for History in the Federal Government with his book Lincoln's Rise to the Presidency 

Most notably, Harris was awarded the Gilder Lehrman Lincoln Prize in 2012.

Publications 

 Presidential Reconstruction in Mississippi. Baton Rouge, Louisiana State University [1967]. 
 The day of the carpetbagger: Republican Reconstruction in Mississippi. Baton Rouge : Louisiana State University Press, 1979. . 
 William Woods Holden: firebrand of North Carolina politics. Baton Rouge: Louisiana State University Press, 1987. . 
 With charity for all: Lincoln and the restoration of the Union. Lexington, Ky.: University Press of Kentucky, 1997. . 
 Lincoln's last months. Cambridge, Mass.: Belknap Press of Harvard University Press, 2004. . 
 Lincoln's rise to the presidency. Lawrence, Kan. : University Press of Kansas, 2007. . 
 Lincoln and the Border States: preserving the Union. Lawrence, Kan.: University Press of Kansas, 2011. . 
 Lincoln and the Union governors. Carbondale: Southern Illinois University Press, 2013. . 
 Two against Lincoln: Reverdy Johnson and Horatio Seymour, Champions of the Loyal Opposition. Lawrence, Kan. : University Press of Kansas, 2017. .

References 

Living people
American military historians
Historians of the American Civil War
Year of birth missing (living people)
Lincoln Prize winners